James F. Lawler (born December 14, 1935) is an American former politician. He served in the South Dakota Senate from 1993 to 2000.

References

1935 births
Living people
Democratic Party members of the South Dakota House of Representatives
Democratic Party South Dakota state senators
People from Howard, South Dakota